The 2022 Morgan State Bears football team represented Morgan State University as a member of the Mid-Eastern Athletic Conference (MEAC) during the 2022 NCAA Division I FCS football season. The Bears, led by first-year head coach Damon Wilson, played their home games at Hughes Stadium.

Previous season

The Bears finished the 2021 season with a record of 2–9, 1–4 MEAC play to finish in a tie for last place.

Schedule

Game summaries

at Georgia Southern

at Towson

Sacred Heart

Virginia–Lynchburg

Norfolk State

at North Carolina Central

at No. 13 Delaware

South Carolina State

at Stony Brook

at Delaware State

Howard

References

Morgan State
Morgan State Bears football seasons
Morgan State Bears football